The 1990–91 Penn State Nittany Lions basketball team represented Pennsylvania State University as a member of the Atlantic-10 Conference during the 1990–91 season. The team was led by head coach Bruce Parkhill and played its home games at Rec Hall in University Park, Pennsylvania. The Nittany Lions won the A-10 tournament to gain an automatic bid to the NCAA tournament. After upsetting UCLA in the first round, Penn State was beaten in overtime by Eastern Michigan in the second round. Penn State finished the season with an overall record of 21–11 (10–8 A-10).

Roster

Schedule and results

|-
!colspan=9 style=| Regular season

|-
!colspan=9 style=| Atlantic 10 Tournament

|-
!colspan=9 style=| NCAA Tournament

– Source:

References 

Penn State Nittany Lions basketball seasons
Penn State
Penn State
1990 in sports in Pennsylvania
1991 in sports in Pennsylvania